The 19th Annual British Academy Television Craft Awards are presented by the British Academy of Film and Television Arts (BAFTA) and was held on 22 April 2018. For the sixth consecutive year, Stephen Mangan was the ceremony's host. The awards were held at The Brewery, City of London, and given in recognition of technical achievements in British television of 2017. The Crown lead the nominations with seven followed by Taboo with six.

Winners and nominees
Winners will be listed first and highlighted in boldface.

Special Award
Game of Thrones

Programmes with multiple nominations

Most major wins

See also
2018 British Academy Television Awards

References

External links
British Academy Craft Awards official website

British Academy Television Craft Awards
British Academy Television Craft Awards
British Academy Television Craft Awards
British Academy Television Craft Awards
British Academy Television Craft Awards